The Tower Building is a historic skyscraper in South Bend, Indiana, United States. The Tower Building is located at 216 West Washington Street, diagonally from the current St. Joseph County Courthouse, and beside the Old Courthouse (Second St. Joseph County Courthouse). Designed by architects Austin & Shambleau, it was built in 1929. The Tower Building was originally to be built in two halves; but the western half was never built. The eastern half was completed during the Wall Street Crash of 1929.

It was listed on the National Register of Historic Places in 1985 and is located in the West Washington Historic District.

The building today houses local businesses, such as Hebard & Hebard Architects, Inc., and Cullar & Associates, PC, CPAs.

References

Commercial buildings on the National Register of Historic Places in Indiana
Gothic Revival architecture in Indiana
Gothic Revival skyscrapers
Commercial buildings completed in 1929
Buildings and structures in South Bend, Indiana
National Register of Historic Places in St. Joseph County, Indiana
Skyscrapers in Indiana
Skyscraper office buildings in Indiana
1929 establishments in Indiana